Aryamba Pattabhi (born 12 March 1936) is an Indian novelist and writer in Kannada language. She is the younger sister of Triveni, a popular Kannada novelist and the niece of B. M. Srikantaiah, a famous Kannada poet, writer and translator.

Her novels have been made into feature films, most prominently, Kappu Bilupu (1969), directed by Puttanna Kanagal and made into three south Indian languages Kannada, Telugu and Tamil, Eradu Mukha (1969) directed by M.R.Vittal and won the Karnataka State Award and best picture award from Madras Film Lovers Association, Savathiya Neralu (1978) directed by Y.R.Swamy and Marali Gudige (1984) directed by Shantharam and won the State Award. Her novel Parampare was selected and published by the Government of Karnataka in 1985.

Early life

Aryamba is the youngest daughter of B.M Krishnaswamy and Thangamma. Krishnaswamy was the younger brother of B. M. Srikantaiah, the doyen of Kannada literature. Aryamba was born on March 12, 1936, in Mandya, in the erstwhile Kingdom of Mysore of British India (in present-day Mysore, Karnataka).
Aryamba comes from an illustrious family of established writers. Her uncle B. M. Srikantaiah was a renowned scholar and poet, whose translations are present in university texts all over the world. Her aunt Vani was a popular novelist. She had two sisters including famous novelist Triveni and four brothers.

Aryamba completed her Master of Arts (MA) in Sociology, from Mysore University.

Career
Over the course of several years, she has published 32 novels, 5 short story collections, 12 books for children, 5 biographies (including one on Mother Teresa whom she interviewed), 6 dramas, 3 essays, and 1 on sports literature. 2015

Aryamba conducted research for several of her biographies, including interviewing Mother Teresa when she had visited Mysore. Like her sister, she began to write fiction at a time when there were very few female writers in Kannada.

Her Eradu Mukha won Karnataka State Award and best picture award from Madras Film Lovers Association. Marali gudige won the State Award. Parampare novel (1985) was selected and published by Government of Karnataka. Bharathada Mahapurusharu was prescribed as the non detailed text book by Karnataka University, IInd PUC for 2 years (1977–1978). Some parts of the book were published in the text book of 10th standard - Karnataka and Kerala state schools. All six of her dramas have been broadcast from Mysuru and Bengaluru A.I.R, stations. She has presented at several literary state seminars throughout Mysore and Bangalore, presented her work on the All India Radio stations, won several awards and felicitations, had her work published in several daily, weekly and monthly Kannada magazines and papers, and is the founder of several organizations. She was the chief editor of "Mahila Sahithya Sameekshe" and "Sahithya Vimarshe".

Four novels have been made into films and several short stories have been translated into Marathi.

Novels 
 Honganasu 1961
 Aradhane 1962
 Priyasangama 1964
 Eradu Mukha 1965
 Kappu Bilupu 1965
 Beesida Bale 1966
 Marali Gudige 1966
 Badukina Bavaneyalli 1967
 Savathiya neralu 1967
 Baduku 1968
 Bevu-Bella 1969
 Atthu Nagisidaga 1972
 Devamanava 1972
 Saakshathkara 1975
 Parampare 1976
 Kasturi 1977
 Premakathe 1978
 Asangatha 1980
 Kamanabillu 1981
 Kunike 1982
 Narabhakshaka 1987
 Vishwadharma 1987
 Prakruthi Purusha 1987
 Sambandhagalu + suli 1999
 Basavi 2000
 Sakumaga + Guri 2002
 Apporva kathe + Bandaya 2004
 Budhimandyathe 2012
 Arohana 2018

Collection of Short stories 

 Marali Banda Mamathe 1968 
 Udayaravi 1968 
 Nannavalu 1970 
 Tere Saridaga 2000 
 "Aryamba pattabhi awara Samagra Kathasankalana" (Fifty five short stories) – 2002.

Films based on her novels

 Kappu-Bilipu 
 Eradu Mukha 
 Savathiya Neralu 
 Marali gudige

Books For Children

 Ranadheera Kanteerava Narasimha Raja Odeyar 1975
 Nalwadi Krishna Raja Odeyar 1975
 Ravindranath Tagore 1987
 Thayi Theresa 1987
 Habbagalu 1987
 Cha.Vasudeviah 1987
 Vignana Sadhakaru Part –1,2,3,4 1991
 Marie Curie 1997
 Triveni 2002

Biographies

 Bharatada Mahapurusharu 1975
 Thayi Theresa 1985
 Mother Teresa 2000(English)
 Mysuru Maharajaru 2016
 Vishwa Vignanigalu 2017

Dramas

 Salu deepa 
 Bekkina Kannu
 Belakinattha
 Dudidavane Doddappa
 Sakumaga
 Kasthuri

Sports Literature

 Tennis - 1987 (Detailed Study on the game of tennis – published by the University of Mysore in 1983, revised edition in 2011)

Essays

 Mahile, Ondu Adhyayana 1998
 Lekhanubandha 2004
 Sthree, Samasye – Saadhane 2018

Personal life

Aryamba married Rajendrapura Pattabhi Ramaiah in 1958. Her hobbies include tennis, table tennis, chess and collecting world stamps and coins.

Awards

State Awards

 "Mallika Prashasthi" for 'Tennis' Kannada Sahithya Parishath – 1989.
 "Attimabe prashasthi" – Attimabe Prathistana Trust, Bengaluru -1996
 "Karnataka Sahithya Academy Award" – Book Prize for 'Videsha Pravasa' 1997.
 "Lingaraj Sahithya Prashasthi" – for 'Videsha Pravasa' – Best Book of the year – 1997.
 "Kannada Lekhakiyara Parishat Prashasthi" – For 'Videsha Pravasa Grantha' in the year 1997.
 "Sir.M.Vishvesvaraiah Navarathna Prashasthi" – 'Bharatharathna Sir.M.Vishvesvaraiah' Engineering Prathistana, Bengaluru 1998
 "Karnataka chethana prashasthi" – 'Kannada Patrika Kala Sanskriti Vedike' Bengaluru 1999
 "Srimathi Savithramma Deja Gou Mahila Sahithya Prashasthi" – DejaGou Trust, Mysuru 1999.
 "Kitturu Rani Chennama Prashasthi"(Literature) – Women and Child Development Department, Karnataka Government 2000.
 "Karnataka Sahithya Academy GOWRAVA Prashasti" Karnataka Sahithya Academy 2000.
 "Unmilana Abhinandana Grantha Samarpane" (State Felicitation Samithi) from state writers - 2002.
 "Smt B S Chandrakala Swara Lipi Prashasti and Lipi Pragne Title" Gayana Samaja, Bengaluru 2003.
 "Sir.M.Vishvesvaraiah Sahithya Prashasti" Sahithya Kshethra, Mysuru 2003.
 "Karnataka Vibhushana Rajya Prashasthi" Karnataka Janatha Sevadala, Bengaluru 2003.
 "Adarsha Seva Rathna Prashasti" – Adarsha Seva Sangha, Mysuru 2006
 "Padmabhushana Dr.B.Sarojadevi Sahithya Prashasthi" Kannada Sahithya Parishath, Bengaluru 2009.
 "Sanchi Honamma Prashasthi" – Amba Prakashana, Yelanduru - 2009
 "Aryabhatta Anthararashtriya Sahithya Prashasthi" – Aryabhatta Sanskrithika Samsthe, Bengaluru 2009.
 "Amma Prashasthi" – Geetharaj Foundation, Mysuru 2012.
 "Vidyaranya Prashasthi" (Sahithya) Vidyaranyapuram Samskruthika Samithi, Mysuru 2014
 "Kannada Rajyothsava Prashasthi" Government of Karnataka (received award from Ex Chief Minister Siddaramaiah ) 2015, Bengaluru.

Felicitations

 Bengaluru Transportation Corporation (BTC) -1971
 Mysore Zilla Kannada Cheluvaligarara Sangha - 1975.
 Lekakiyara Sahithya Sammelana, Kannada Sangha, Davanagere -1981.
 Rajyothsava Samaramba, Mandya -1984.
 Dejegow Samskrithika Prathishtana, Mysuru - 1984.
 4th Akhila Karnataka Lekhakiyara Sahithya Sammelana, Mandya- 1985
 Bramhana Sabha, Mandya- 1992
 Sri. Ganapathi Sachindananda Swamy Ashrama, Mysuru - 1992
 Rotary West, Mysuru -1994
 Babburu Kamme Seva samithi, Bengaluru - 1995.
 BEML Kannada Sangha, Mysuru -1997
 Maharani Arts and Commerce College, Mysuru - 1997
 Girija Kalyanothsava, Srikanteshwara Temple Nanjangud - 1997
 Kannada Samskruthika Samsthe, Vidyaranyapuram, Mysuru - 1997
 Kannada Lekhakiyara Trust, Mysuru - 1997.
 Akhila Karnataka Bramhana Mahasabhe, Prathama Vipra Mahila Sammelana, Bengaluru - 2000
 Sri Anjaneyaswamy Devasthana Trust, Mysuru - 2000
 Sri. Lakshmi Mahila Samaja, Mysuru - 2000
 Sharada Nikethana Hostel, Mysuru, -2000
 Mahila chinthana samavesha, Maddur & Mahila adhyayana vibhaga, Hampi University - 2006
 Vipra Mahila Sangama Trust, Mysuru - 2006.
 Karnataka Janathadala, Bengaluru - 2006
 Arivina mane mahila balaga, Mysuru -2006
 Vipra mahila vedike, Piriyapatna - 2007
 Prajapitha Bramhakumari Eshwari Vidyalaya, Mysuru - 2009
 The Institute of Engineers, Mysuru - 2009
 Bramhana Mahila Vedike, Mysuru - 2012.
 The Graduate Co-operative Bank, Mysuru in the year 2014.
 Sahakara sangha, Srirangapatna - 2016

Felicitations in the Year 2015

 Koutilya University
 T.T.L.College
 Cosmopolitan Club
 Kadamba Ranga vedike
 Kannada Odhugara okkuta
 Bankers Recreation Club
 Sankalpa Manimandira Apartment
 Kannada Sahithya Kala Koota and Kalpavrukhsa Trust
 Vismaya Prakashana
 Samvahana Samskruthika Trust
 Githa Shishu Shikshana Sangha
 Writers from Mandya
 State Bank of Mysore
 Sri Lakshmi Mahila Society
 Institute of Engineers
 Mysuru Chess Association
 Babburu Kamme Yashaswini Mahila Sangha

Presentations in Literary State Seminars

 Vichara Gosti, Kannada Lekakiyara Sangha, Bengaluru-1967. 
 Ramamurthy Kannada Mithra Sangha, Bengaluru -1970. 
 District Sahithya Sammelana, Hassan – 1971. 
 48th Akila Kannada Sahitya Sasmmelana, Mysuru -1974. 
 Third Akila Karnataka Women Writers Sammelana, Tumkur-1984. 
 Fifth District Sahithya Sammelana, Chikkamagalur – 1984. 
 Chaithrothsava, Kannada Sahithya Parishat, Hubli – 1984. 
 Fourth Akhila Karnataka Women Writers Sammelana, Mandya-1985. 
 Sarvadharma and Sahithya Sammelana, 59th Adiveshana, Dharmasthala – 1988. 
 Vasantha Sahithyothsava, Kannada Sahithya Parishat, Pandavapura – 1988. 
 Second State Level Lekakiyara Sammelana, Kannada Sahithya Parishat, Bengaluru -1990. 
 Akila Karnataka Lekakiyara Sammelana, Davanagere- 1990. 
 Karnataka State Makkala Sahitya Vedike, Bengaluru-1991. 
 President of Mysuru District Lekakiyara Sammelana, Mysuru-08th and 9 March 1992. 
 Mysuru District Sahitya Sammelana, T.Narasipur – 1993 
 Akila Karnataka Lekakiyara Sammelana, Davanagere-1993. 
 Suvarna Mahotsava, Kannada Lekakiyara Sangha, Bengaluru-1993. 
 First Mysore City, Brahmins Sammelana – 1994. 
 Mahila Samvada Gosti, Mysuru-2001. 
 Akka‟ Rastriya Mahila Natakothsava, Mysuru-2001. 
 Mandya District Sixth Kannada Sahithya Sammelana, Bengaluru-2003. 
 Karnataka Reshme Udyamigala Nigama Kendra, Bengaluru-2009. 
 Karnataka Sahitya Academy „Rajyothsava‟ – 2010. 
 B.M.Shri- Ondu Nenapu‟, Mysore University – 2011. 
 B.Nanjamma Book release function, Bengaluru -2014. 
 Kavitha Smaraka Prashasti Pradhana and book release function by Yashoda Ragow trust – 2015.

Talks

 Chintanagalu (around 15, all major hindu festivals)
 Bekkina Kannu(Triveni's novel) broadcast in - 1998
 Smt Vani interview – 1980.
 Participated in the programme – "Triveni Ondu Nenapu"
 Twenty five short stories
 Talk on "Mother Teresa"
 One hour interview by Dr.H.P.Geetha

Organizations

 Publisher, Poornima Prakashana, Mysuru
 Ex- President, Kannada Lekhakiyara Trust, Mysuru
 President, Mahila Dhyana Vidyapeeta, Mysuru.
 Founder member, C.N.Jayalakshmidevi trust, Mysuru.
 Life member, Kannada Sahitya Parishat,
 Founder, President – Womens Sports Club.
 Ex-president, old students Association, Maharani‟s Arts and Commerce college, Mysuru.
 Ex-member, Book Selection Committee, State Library, Bengaluru.

References

1936 births
Living people
20th-century Indian women writers
Kannada-language writers
Women writers from Karnataka
People from Mandya
20th-century Indian novelists
Novelists from Karnataka
Recipients of the Rajyotsava Award 2015